Science City Kolkata is the largest science centre in Asia. It is managed by National Council of Science Museums (NCSM), Ministry of Culture, Government of India. It is located at the crossing of Eastern Metropolitan Bypass and J. B. S. Haldane Avenue (Parama Island) in East Topsia. Saroj Ghose, the first director general of NCSM, is credited with having conceptualised this centre in 1997. This centre was inaugurated by two parts: the ‘Convention Centre Complex’ was unveiled on 21 December 1996 by Paul Jozef Crutzen in presence of the then chief minister Jyoti Basu and the whole centre was opened by the then prime minister Inder Kumar Gujral on 1 July 1997. On 10 January 2010, prime minister of India, Manmohan Singh laid the foundation stone for the second phase of Science City in presence of the then chief minister of West Bengal, Buddhadeb Bhattacharjee.

It is an ideal place to visit and enjoy, great for science students.

Galleries

Dynamotion Hall

Hands-on and interactive exhibits on various topics of science encouraging visitors to experience with props and enjoy the underlying scientific principles.

 Illusions. A permanent exhibition on the world of illusions with interactive exhibits, explores how motion and placement make a different in the visual perception.
 Powers of Ten. 43 exhibits unfold the smallest or the biggest of the universe through zooming in or out in the order of ten.
 Fresh Water Aquarium. Variety of fresh water fishes in 26 tanks; provide the bio-diversity of the fish species.
 Live Butterfly Enclave. A colony of live butterflies hatched here and screening of a film Rang Bahari Prajapati on life cycle of butterfly.
 Science On a Sphere. The spherical projection system created by NOAA. Each show of 30 minutes duration for around 70 people at a time.

Earth Exploration Hall 
Inaugurated on 6 December 2008 by Ambika Soni, the then Union Minister for Culture, India. A permanent exhibition on earth is housed in a two storied hemispherical building that displays the details of the southern hemisphere in the ground floor and northern hemisphere in the first floor. Slicing a huge earth globe at the centre of the hall into 12 segments vertically in each hemisphere, important features of each segment such as physical geography, lands and people, flora and fauna and other dynamic natural phenomenon on earth have been highlighted around the central globe with the modern display technologies such as attractive visuals, interactive multimedia, video walls, panoramic videos, tilting tables, computer kiosks and 3-D effects theatre wearing a special Polaroid spectacle.

Space Odyssey 
Comprising Space Theatre equipped with Helios Star Ball planetarium supported by 150 special effect projectors and Astrovision 10/70 Large format Film Projection system housed in a 23-meter diameter tilted dome having unidirectional seating arrangements for 360 person immersive shows on sciences. Now the Astrovision film Adventures in Wild California  of 40 minutes duration has been screening from June, 2013.

 3-D Vision Theater. A show based on stereo back projection system where visitors experience 3D effect by Polaroid spectacles.
 Mirror Magic. There are 35 exhibits based on reflection of light.
 Time Machine. 30-seater motion simulator provides virtual experience of space flight or journey into unknown world sitting in a casual maneuvered by hydraulic motion control system.

Maritime Centre

Depicts maritime history of India, artifacts, dioramas and interactive exhibits on shipping and navigation systems. There is an unmanned quiz corner also.

Science Park

In a tropical country like India, the outdoor is sunny and more inviting than the indoors for most part of the year. In a Science Park, people come closer to plants, animals and other objects in their natural surroundings and also learn about the basic principles of science in an open air learning environment. The park interactive exhibits are engineered so as to tolerate all the weather. Science Park has become the integral part in all the centres of NCSM. It comprises Caterpillar Ride, Gravity Coaster, Musical Fountain, Road Train, Cable Cars, Monorail Cycle, butterfly nursery and several exhibits on physical and life sciences and a maze set up in a lush green ambience.
there are many people came in different states

Science Exploration Hall

The 5400 square metres new building was opened in 2016.It is provided with the latest infrastructure and provides an enquiry based learning to the visitors. It has four sections:-
 Emerging Technologies gallery
 Evolution of Life a dark ride
 Panorama on Human Evolution (360 degree projection). Depicts the evolution of life over the ages, on the world's largest Panoramic Display.  
 Science and Technology Heritage of India gallery

Other facilities
Convention Centre Complex

 Grand Theater: 2232 seating capacity main auditorium with stage for 100 performers at a time is the largest auditorium in eastern India.
 Mini Auditorium: 392 seating capacity, with stage for 30 performers at a time is ideal for smaller conferences and shows.
 Seminar Building: Comprising eleven halls, four with seating capacity of 100 persons, two with seating capacity of 40 persons each, two with seating capacity of 30 persons each, two with seating capacity of 15 persons and a meeting room for 12 persons, is ideal venue for conference, seminars, meeting and workshops.

See also
 Swami Vivekananda Planetarium, Mangalore
 Pushpa Gujral Science City, Kapurthala, Punjab, India
 Gujarat Science City, Ahmedabad, Gujarat, India 
 Science City at Union Station, Kansas City, Missouri, United States
 Science Centre, Surat
 Science City Chennai

External Link 
Official Website

References

Museums in Kolkata
Science museums in India
1997 establishments in West Bengal
Science parks in India
Science centres in India